Miłosz Stefan Mleczko (born 1 March 1999) is a Polish professional footballer who plays as a goalkeeper for Polish club Znicz Pruszków.

Club career
On 27 August 2020, he was loaned to Widzew Łódź.

On 30 January 2023, after spending nearly nine years at Lech, it was announced he would be leaving the club with immediate effect after terminating his contract by mutual consent.

On 20 February 2023, Mleczko joined I liga side Znicz Pruszków.

Career statistics

References 

1999 births
Living people
People from Gorlice
Sportspeople from Lesser Poland Voivodeship
Polish footballers
Poland youth international footballers
Association football goalkeepers
Lech Poznań II players
Lech Poznań players
Puszcza Niepołomice players
Widzew Łódź players
Znicz Pruszków players
Ekstraklasa players
I liga players
II liga players
III liga players